Dispossessed was an Australian metal band formed in 2015. They sing in a mixture of English and Gumbaynggirr. They have been described as "the most uncompromising, unapologetic and important band in Australia." The band played their final show in November 2019 in Doonside, New South Wales.

Band members
Final line-up
Serwah Attafuah (guitar)
Harry Bonifacio Baughan (vocals)
Jacob Cummins (guitar)
Jarrod Smith (drums)

Former members
Birrugan Dunn-Velasco (vocals, guitar)
Lauren Guerrera (bass)
Marcus Whale (noise, electronics)

Discography
Insurgency (2016)
Warpath Never Ended  (2019)

References

Australian heavy metal musical groups
Indigenous Australian musical groups
Musical groups established in 2015
2015 establishments in Australia